

Castles and fortresses
 Älvsborg Fortress (Gothenburg)
 Bjärka-Säby Castle (Linköping)
 Castle Boo (Hjortkvarn)
 Bohus Fortress (Kungälv)
 Borgholm Castle (Borgholm)
 Brahehus
 Carlsten Fortress (Marstrand)
 Christinehov Castle (Andrarum)
 Dalaborg
 Dagsnäs Castle (Bjurum)
 Ekenäs Castle (Ekenäs)
 Eketorp (Öland)
 Ekolsund Castle
 Eriksberg Manor
 Glimmingehus
 Gråborg
 Gripenberg Castle
 Gripsholm Castle (Mariefred)
 Gunnebo Castle
 Göksholm Castle
 Hörningsholm Castle
 Ismantorp Fortress
 Johannishus Castle (Johannishus)
 Kalmar Castle (Kalmar)
 Karlberg Castle
 Karlsborg Fortress (Karlsborg)
 Kärnan (Helsingborg)
 Krapperup Castle
 Läckö Castle (Kållandsö)
 Leufsta / Lövstabruk (near Tierp)
 Löfstad Castle (Norrköping)
 Mariedal Castle (Lundsbrunn)
 Mårbacka
 Mälsåker Castle
 Maltesholm Castle
 Nääs Castle (Lerum near Gothenburg)
 Nynäs Castle
 Örebro Castle (Örebro)
 Öster-Malma Castle
 Övedskloster Castle
 Pålsjö Castle
 Penningby Castle
 Rosersberg Castle (Rosersberg)
 Runsa
 Rydboholm Castle (Vaxholm)
 Salnecke Castle
 Salsta Castle
 Sandemar Castle
 Sjöö Castle
 Skansen Crown (Gothenburg)
 Skokloster Castle (Slottskogen)
 Skottorp Castle (Skottorp)
 Sofiero (Helsingborg)
 Sövdeborg Castle
 Stenhammar Palace
 Steninge Palace (Märsta)
 Sturefors Castle
 Sturehov Castle
 Sundbyholm Castle
 Svaneholm Castle
 Tjolöholm Castle
 Torup Castle
 Torpa Stenhus
 Trollenäs Castle
 Tynnelsö Castle
 Tyresö Castle
 Uppsala Castle
 Vadstena Castle
 Venngarn Castle
 Vittskövle Castle
 Wik Castle

Palaces 

 Bååt Palace (Stockholm)
 Bonde Palace (Stockholm)
 Drottningholm Palace (Lövö)
 Hallwyl Palace (Stockholm)
 Sager House (Stockholm)
 Solliden Palace, (Borgholm)
 Stenbock Palace (Stockholm)
 Stockholm Palace (Stockholm)
 Strömsholm Palace (Strömsholm)
 Tessin Palace (Stockholm)
 Tullgarn Palace
 Ulriksdal Palace (Solna near Stockholm)
 Wrangel Palace (Stockholm)

Churches and monasteries 
 Alvastra Abbey (Ruins)
 Gothenburg Cathedral (Gothenburg)
 Husaby Church (Husaby)
 Jokkmokks Church (Jokkmokk)
 Katarina kyrka (Church of St. Catherine) (Stockholm)
 Kalmar Cathedral (Kalmar)
 Kiruna kyrka (Kiruna)
 Linköping Cathedral (Linköping)
 Lund Cathedral (Lund)
 Mariestad Cathedral (Mariestad)
 Masthuggskyrkan (Gothenburg)
 Storkyrkan, Stockholm Cathedral, or Church of St. Nicholas (Stockholm)
 Nydala Monastery
 Roma Abbey
 Skara Cathedral (Skara)
 Trefaldighetskyrkan (Karlskrona)
 German Church or Tyska kyrkan (Stockholm)
 Uppsala Cathedral (Uppsala)
 Varnhem Monastery (Varnhem)
 Vadstena Abbey (Vadstena)
 Vittskövle Church (Kristianstad Municipality)

Other historic buildings 
 Bollhuset (Stockholm)
 Gathenhiemska huset (Gothenburg)
 Halltorps (Öland)
 Kronhuset (Gothenburg)
 Lejonkulan (Stockholm)
 City Museum of Gothenburg (Gothenburg)
 Swedish House of Lords (Stockholm)
 Stockholm City Hall (Stockholm)
 Västra/Östra boställshuset (Stockholm)

See also
 Architecture of Sweden
 Listed buildings in Sweden

References
 Some material translated from the German Wikipedia.

Historic buildings
Historic buildings